John Milton Whitehead (March 6, 1823 - March 8, 1909) was an American chaplain who received the Medal of Honor for his actions in the American Civil War.

Biography 
Whitehead was born in Wayne County, Indiana on March 6, 1823. He was ordained as Baptist Minister at age 21 before the war and would continue working in that profession after the war. He served as a chaplain in the 15th Indiana Volunteer Infantry Regiment during the Civil War after enlisting at Westville, Indiana at age 39. He earned his medal in action at Battle of Stones River, Murfreesboro, Tennessee on December 31, 1862. Whitehead was married to Mary with whom he had a son named John. He also had a sister named Linda. He moved to Kansas in the 1880s and stayed in Silver and eventually Topeka. He helped found the First Baptist Church in Topeka. Whitehead received his medal on April 4, 1898. Whitehead died in Topeka, Kansas on March 8, 1909, and is now buried in Topeka Cemetery, Topeka, Kansas.

References 

1823 births
1909 deaths
19th-century American clergy
United States Army Medal of Honor recipients
American Civil War recipients of the Medal of Honor
People of Indiana in the American Civil War